The palm forest tree frog (Leptopelis palmatus) is a species of frog in the family Arthroleptidae which is endemic to Príncipe island in São Tomé and Príncipe. Red tree frog Leptopelis rufus from the African mainland was for a long time included in this species, but is now considered a distinct species.

Description
The palm forest tree frog is a large species: females measure  in snout–vent length. The tympanum is large and the feet are fully webbed. The colouring varies, but the dorsum is typically dark green to black, sometimes with many light spots giving the frog a marbled appearance. The ventrum is dark and has a granular surface. Compared to the red tree frog, this species has larger choanae (the apertures where the nasal passages join the throat), larger tympani and differences in skin texture.

Habitat and conservation
It also occurs in forest remnants and possibly in towns. It is believed that eggs are buried close to water; when they hatch, the tadpoles move into pools or streams where they complete their development.

It is a reasonably common species throughout the island, although habitat loss through development is a potential future threat. This frog is not present in any protected areas, and the International Union for Conservation of Nature has assessed its conservation status as being "endangered", and considers that the population requires careful monitoring.

References

palmatus
Endemic vertebrates of São Tomé and Príncipe
Endemic fauna of Príncipe
Amphibians described in 1868
Taxa named by Wilhelm Peters
Frogs of Africa
Taxonomy articles created by Polbot